Hiroaki Yoshioka (born January 3, 1974) is a Japanese mixed martial artist. He competed in the Strawweight, Flyweight and Bantamweight divisions.

Mixed martial arts record

|-
| Loss
| align=center| 6-10-2
| Junji Ito
| Decision (unanimous)
| Shooto: Shooting Disco 11: Tora Tora Tora!
| 
| align=center| 3
| align=center| 5:00
| Tokyo, Japan
| 
|-
| Win
| align=center| 6-9-2
| Hiroyuki Abe
| Submission (guillotine choke)
| Shooto: Kitazawa Shooto 2009 Vol. 2
| 
| align=center| 2
| align=center| 3:08
| Tokyo, Japan
| 
|-
| Loss
| align=center| 5-9-2
| Takuya Mori
| Decision (unanimous)
| Shooto: Gig North 1
| 
| align=center| 2
| align=center| 5:00
| Sapporo, Hokkaido, Japan
| 
|-
| Loss
| align=center| 5-8-2
| Junji Ikoma
| Submission (rear-naked choke)
| Shooto: 5/8 in Osaka Prefectural Gymnasium
| 
| align=center| 3
| align=center| 1:36
| Tokyo, Japan
| 
|-
| Loss
| align=center| 5-7-2
| Mamoru Yamaguchi
| KO (knee to the body)
| Shooto 2004: 5/3 in Korakuen Hall
| 
| align=center| 3
| align=center| 4:41
| Tokyo, Japan
| 
|-
| Loss
| align=center| 5-6-2
| Junji Ikoma
| Technical Submission (rear-naked choke)
| Shooto: 8/10 in Yokohama Cultural Gymnasium
| 
| align=center| 2
| align=center| 3:26
| Yokohama, Kanagawa, Japan
| 
|-
| Loss
| align=center| 5-5-2
| Kimihito Nonaka
| Decision (unanimous)
| Shooto: Gig Central 2
| 
| align=center| 3
| align=center| 5:00
| Nagoya, Aichi, Japan
| 
|-
| Win
| align=center| 5-4-2
| Ichaku Murata
| Decision (unanimous)
| Shooto: Treasure Hunt 9
| 
| align=center| 3
| align=center| 5:00
| Setagaya, Tokyo, Japan
| 
|-
| Loss
| align=center| 4-4-2
| Mamoru Yamaguchi
| Decision (unanimous)
| Shooto: Wanna Shooto 2002
| 
| align=center| 3
| align=center| 5:00
| Setagaya, Tokyo, Japan
| 
|-
| Loss
| align=center| 4-3-2
| Hisao Ikeda
| Decision (unanimous)
| Shooto: Treasure Hunt 1
| 
| align=center| 3
| align=center| 5:00
| Tokyo, Japan
| 
|-
| Win
| align=center| 4-2-2
| Kentaro Imaizumi
| Decision (unanimous)
| Shooto: Gig East 5
| 
| align=center| 3
| align=center| 5:00
| Tokyo, Japan
| 
|-
| Loss
| align=center| 3-2-2
| Jin Akimoto
| Decision (unanimous)
| Shooto: To The Top 3
| 
| align=center| 3
| align=center| 5:00
| Setagaya, Tokyo, Japan
| 
|-
| Draw
| align=center| 3-1-2
| Takeyasu Hirono
| Draw
| Shooto: To The Top 1
| 
| align=center| 3
| align=center| 5:00
| Tokyo, Japan
| 
|-
| Win
| align=center| 3-1-1
| Masaru Gokita
| KO (head kick)
| Shooto: R.E.A.D. 10
| 
| align=center| 1
| align=center| 0:17
| Tokyo, Japan
| 
|-
| Win
| align=center| 2-1-1
| Shuichiro Katsumura
| Submission (armbar)
| Shooto: R.E.A.D. 7
| 
| align=center| 2
| align=center| 3:43
| Setagaya, Tokyo, Japan
| 
|-
| Win
| align=center| 1-1-1
| Daiji Takahashi
| Decision (split)
| Shooto: R.E.A.D. 4
| 
| align=center| 2
| align=center| 5:00
| Setagaya, Tokyo, Japan
| 
|-
| Loss
| align=center| 0-1-1
| Yoshinobu Ota
| Decision (majority)
| Shooto: Shooter's Soul
| 
| align=center| 2
| align=center| 5:00
| Setagaya, Tokyo, Japan
| 
|-
| Draw
| align=center| 0-0-1
| Masaki Nishizawa
| Draw
| Shooto: Shooter's Dream
| 
| align=center| 2
| align=center| 5:00
| Setagaya, Tokyo, Japan
|

See also
List of male mixed martial artists

References

External links
 

1974 births
Japanese male mixed martial artists
Strawweight mixed martial artists
Flyweight mixed martial artists
Bantamweight mixed martial artists
Living people